Results for the Quarterfinals, also called the Playoffs of the 2014–15 Euroleague basketball tournament.

The quarterfinals will be played in April 2015. Team #1 (i.e., the group winner in each series) will host Games 1 and 2, plus Game 5 if it is necessary. Team #2 will host Game 3, plus Game 4 if necessary.

Summary

Game 1

Game 2

Game 3

Game 4

References

Quarter-finals